Shchuchansky District is an administrative and municipal district (raion), one of the twenty-four in Kurgan Oblast, Russia. It is located in the west of the oblast. Its administrative center is the town of Shchuchye. Population:  26,392 (2002 Census);  The population of Shchuchye accounts for 46.6% of the district's total population.

References

Notes

Sources

Districts of Kurgan Oblast